Xishi District is a district of the city of Yingkou, Liaoning province, People's Republic of China.

Administrative divisions
There are seven subdistricts in the district: Wutaizi Subdistrict, Yushi Subdistrict, Desheng Subdistrict, Qinghua Subdistrict, Hebei Subdistrict, Shengli Subdistrict, Xishichang Subdistrict.

References

External links

County-level divisions of Liaoning
Yingkou